Yuan Huangtou (died in 559) was the son of emperor Yuan Lang of Northern Wei dynasty of China. At that time, paramount general Gao Yang took control of the court of Northern Wei's branch successor state Eastern Wei and set the emperor as a puppet. After Gao deposed the last Eastern Wei emperor and established himself as the emperor of Northern Qi, he exterminated the imperial clan of the previous dynasty. Yuan Huangtou was imprisoned by Gao Yang and, along with other prisoners and against his will, flown via a large kite from the tower of Ye, China. The Zizhi Tongjian records that all the condemned kite airmen died except for him. "Gao Yang made Yuan Huangtou and other prisoners take off from the Tower of the Phoenix attached to paper owls. Yuan Huangtou was the only one who succeeded in flying as far as the Purple Way, and there he came to earth." The Purple Way, a road, was 2.5 km from the approximately 33 metre tall Golden Phoenix Tower. 

He survived this flight, but was later starved to death in prison.

See also
 List of firsts in aviation

References

Year of birth missing
559 deaths
Northern Wei imperial princes
Northern Qi people
Aviation pioneers
Aviation history of China
Kite flying
6th-century Chinese people
Artificial wings